Howitz  may refer to:
 Howitzer, a type of artillery gun
 Konrad Howitz, the sirtuin activating compounds discoverer